Fusinus maroccensis is a species of sea snail, a marine gastropod mollusk in the family Fasciolariidae, the spindle snails, the tulip snails and their allies.

Description

Distribution
Fusinus maroccensis is found mainly in European waters.

References

External links

maroccensis
Gastropods described in 1791